Zhao Mengfu (courtesy name Zi'ang (子昂); pseudonyms Songxue (松雪, "Pine Snow"), Oubo (鷗波, "Gull Waves"), and Shuijing-gong Dao-ren (水精宮道人, "Master of the Water Spirits Palace"); 1254–1322), was a Chinese calligrapher, painter, and scholar during the Yuan dynasty. He was a descendant of the Song dynasty's imperial family through Emperor Xiaozong's brother Zhao Bogui who married a lady surnamed Song who was the granddaughter of Emperor Huizong. Zhao Bogui was a descendant of Emperor Taizu, through his son Zhao Defang.

He was recommended by the Censor-in-chief  to pay an audience with Kublai Khan in 1286 at the Yuan capital of Dadu, but was not awarded an important position in office. His work was however, greatly appreciated later by the Confucian-inspired Yuan Emperor Renzong. Zhao was a member of the "Academy of Worthies".

He was married to Guan Daosheng, who was also an accomplished poet, painter and calligrapher. His rejection of the refined, gentle brushwork of his era in favour of the cruder style of the eighth century is considered to have brought about a revolution that created the modern Chinese landscape painting. He was known for his paintings of horses.  His landscapes are also considered to be done in a style that focuses more on a literal laying of ground.  Rather than organizing them in a foreground, middle ground, and background pattern he layers middle grounds at various heights to create a sense of depth.  This pattern of organization makes his paintings appear very simple and approachable. It was this characteristic that so many people valued about his style.

One of his most celebrated landscape paintings is exhibited at the Princeton University Art Museum with the title “The Mind Landscape of Xie Youyu” (幼輿丘壑), an allusion to the nature-loving scholar-official Xie Youyu (280–322). However, in 2019 Dutch scholar Lennert Gesterkamp argued that the colophon attached to the painting and mentioning Xie Youyu is a forgery, and that in fact Zhao Mengfu's intention was to honor his own spiritual master, Daoist scholar Du Daojian (1237–1318), who also celebrated nature.

Zhao Mengfu had several sons with his wife Guan Daosheng. His second son, Zhao Yong, also became a famous painter and calligrapher.  He was also the maternal grandfather of Wang Meng, another famous painter. Zhao Mengfu was related to the later Ming dynasty literary figure Zhao Yiguang and his son Zhao Jun.

Paintings

Calligraphic works

Legacy
 

The former residence of Zhao Mengfu in Huzhou, Zhejiang province has been restored into a museum, and opened to public since 2012.

A 167 kilometer diameter crater on Mercury (132.4° west, 87.3° south) was named the "Chao Meng-Fu crater" in memorial of him.

Genealogy
 Zhao Kuangyin
 Zhao Defang
 Zhao Weixian
 Zhao Congyu
 Zhao Shijiang
 Zhao Linghua
 Zhao Zicheng 
 Zhao Bogui
 Zhao Shichui
 Zhao Xiyan
 Zhao Yuyin
Zhao Mengfu

See also
 Hanlin Academy
 House of Zhao
 Yuan poetry

References

 Mu, Yiqin, "Zhao Mengfu". Encyclopedia of China (Arts Edition), 1st ed.
 Zhao Mengfu: Calligraphy and Painting for Khubilai's China
 Wang Lianqi, ed., 王連起 （主編），《師古還是求新——趙孟頫的藝術與時代 （上下冊）》(Mastering the Past or Seeking the New: The Art and Times of Zhao Mengfu), Beijing: Renmin meishu chubanshe, 2019.
 Li. The Autumn Colors on the Ch'iao and Hua Mountains: A Landscape by Chao Meng-Fu. 1965.
 Freer Gallery of Art, and Chu-Tsing Li. The Freer Sheep and Goat and Chao Meng-Fu's Horse Paintings. Artibus Asiae Publishers, Ascona, Switzerland, 1968.

External links

 Zhao Mengfu Calligraphy "Rhapsody on Goddess of Luo"
 Calligraphy Gallery of Zhao Mengfu at China Online Museum
 Painting Gallery of Zhao Mengfu at China Online Museum
 Works in the collection of the Metropolitan Museum, New York
 Landscapes Clear and Radiant: The Art of Wang Hui (1632–1717), an exhibition catalog from The Metropolitan Museum of Art (fully available online as PDF), which contains material on Zhao Mengfu (see index)
 Sung and Yuan paintings, an exhibition catalog from The Metropolitan Museum of Art Libraries (fully available online as PDF), which contains material on Zhao Mengfu (see list of paintings)

1254 births
1322 deaths
13th-century Chinese calligraphers
13th-century Chinese painters
14th-century Chinese calligraphers
14th-century Chinese painters
Buddhist artists
Chinese scholars
Painters from Zhejiang
People from Huzhou
Song dynasty calligraphers
Song dynasty painters
Yuan dynasty calligraphers
Yuan dynasty painters